Andy Pollitt (26 October 1963 –13 November 2019) was a British rock climber who was one of the most famous climbers of the 1980s and 90s. In 1993, Pollitt emigrated to Australia, where he successfully climbed one of the world's hardest climbs, Punk in the Gym, before quitting climbing. In 2016, Pollitt published an autobiography, titled Punk in the Gym. He died from a cerebral aneurysm on 13 November 2019.

Early life 
Andy Pollitt was born in Prestatyn, Wales on 26 October 1963. He attended Prestatyn High School, where he began climbing.

Climbing career 
In the 1980s and early 1990s, Pollitt rose to fame as a climber, completing over 350 climbs, and many first ascents. He was renowned for his boldness and his distinctive fashion; he wore his hair long and sported bright, tight lycra.

In 1993, Pollitt moved to Australia, where he worked as a rope access technician in Melbourne while working on the climb "Punks in the Gym", first climbed by Wolfgang Güllich. It was the first climb to be classified at "8b+" difficulty. He eventually succeeded, in what would be his final climb.

Later life and death 
Pollitt sold his climbing gear on the same day he climbed Punks in the Gym, and gave up climbing for good. In the years before his death, Pollitt returned to his climbing past, publishing an autobiography under the title Punk in the Gym (a play on Punks in the Gym, the final climb Pollitt completed) in 2016. In the book, Pollitt revealed that he suffered from bipolar disorder.

Pollitt died on 13 November 2019. He had suffered a cerebral aneurysm whilst standing in a bar, and never regained consciousness.

References 

British rock climbers
1963 births
2019 deaths